The 2018 CS Lombardia Trophy was held in September 2018 in Bergamo, Italy. It was part of the 2018–19 ISU Challenger Series. Medals were awarded in the disciplines of men's singles, ladies' singles, pair skating, and ice dancing.

Entries
The International Skating Union published the list of entries on August 13, 2018.

Changes to preliminary assignments

Results

Men

Ladies

Pairs

Ice dancing

References

External links
 2018 CS Lombardia Trophy at the International Skating Union

Lombardia Trophy
Lombardia Trophy
Lombardia Trophy